Arthur Gurr Hinman (19 June 1890 – 10 May 1915) was an Australian rules footballer who played for the University Football Club in the Victorian Football League (VFL).

Family
The third of four children of Arthur Hinman (c.1858-1914), and Lucy Maud Hinman (?–1918), née Gurr, Arthur Gurr Hinman Hinman was born in Launceston, on 19 June 1890.

He was the elder brother of VFL footballer Bill Hinman.

Education
He was educated at Launceston Church Grammar School.

While in his final year at school, he played for the Launceston Football Club, before studying science at the University of Tasmania.

He subsequently studied mining engineering at the University of Melbourne.

Football
During 1910 and 1911 he was a regular player for the University Football Club in the VFL competition. Notable events in his career include a burst artery in his arm and missing a match in 1911 because he was on an expedition.

Having completed his final exams in 1913, graduating B.M.Eng. in absentia, in April 1914, Hinman returned to Tasmania to work for the Mount Bischoff Tin Mine.

Military service

Hinman enlisted soon after World War I broke out and joined the 15th Battalion, which departed Australia in late December 1914. After a period of training in Egypt, during which he was promoted to Lieutenant, Hinman first saw action at Gallipoli on 25 April 1915.

Death
He died when retreating after an unsuccessful attempt by the 15th Battalion to take Quinn's Post on 10 May 1915.

See also
 List of Victorian Football League players who died in active service

Footnotes

References
 
 
 Main, J. & Allen, D., "Hinman, Arthur", pp. 81–83 in Main, J. & Allen, D., Fallen – The Ultimate Heroes: Footballers Who Never Returned From War, Crown Content, (Melbourne), 2002.
 First World War Nominal Roll: Lieutenant Arthur Gurr Hinman, Australian War Memorial.
First World War Embarkation Roll: Lieutenant Arthur Gurr Hinman, Australian War Memorial.
 First World War Service Record: Lieutenant Arthur Gurr Hinman, National Archives of Australia.
 Application for War Gratuity (Lieutenant Arthur Gurr Hinman), National Archives of Australia.
 Australian War Memorial Roll of Honour: Arthur Gurr Hinman.
 Lieutenant Arthur Gurr Hinman, Commonwealth War Graves Commission.

External links

 Group Portrait of Officers of the 15th Battalion prior to Embarkation Overseas, Collection of the Australian War Museum.

1890 births
Australian rules footballers from Launceston, Tasmania
People educated at Launceston Church Grammar School
University of Tasmania alumni
University of Melbourne alumni
Launceston Football Club players
University Football Club players
Australian military personnel killed in World War I
1915 deaths
Military personnel from Tasmania